Steven Craig Zahler (born January 23, 1973) is an American film director, screenwriter, cinematographer, novelist, comic book artist, animator and musician.

After beginning his career working briefly as a cinematographer, Zahler focused on screenwriting until he made his directorial debut with Bone Tomahawk (2015). He followed this up with Brawl in Cell Block 99 (2017) and Dragged Across Concrete (2018), all of which he wrote and composed the music for.  He has also authored several novels.

Early life and education
Zahler was born in Miami, Florida, to a Jewish family. Zahler studied film at New York University.

Career 
His debut noir western novel, A Congregation of Jackals, was nominated for The Spur Award by the Western Writers of America and The Peacekeeper by the Western Fictioneers. Corpus Chrome, Inc., A Congregation of Jackals and Mean Business on North Ganson Street all received starred reviews for excellence in Booklist.

As a drummer, lyricist and singer, Zahler, under the stage name Czar, collaborates with Jeff Herriott, as JH Halberd, to write and perform songs as the heavy metal band Realmbuilder, who have three albums on Swedish label I Hate Records. This is following Zahler's foray into black metal with the project Charnel Valley, for which he played drums, wrote lyrics and shared songwriting duties with Worm.  The two Charnel Valley albums were released by Paragon Records.

Zahler also wrote the script for a 2011 horror film Asylum Blackout (also released as The Incident at Sans Asylum and The Incident), which was directed by Alexandre Courtès.

In 2015, Zahler made his directorial debut, writing and directing the horror western Bone Tomahawk, which stars Kurt Russell, Patrick Wilson, Matthew Fox, Lili Simmons, David Arquette and Richard Jenkins. The film was released on October 23, 2015, in theaters and on video on demand.

Bone Tomahawk was met with favorable reception, winning a few awards. The film is 'Certified Fresh' by Rotten Tomatoes, where it has received positive reviews from 90% of critics. The New York Times called it "[a] witty fusion of western, horror and comedy that gallops to its own beat", while the LA Times said "There's a humming genre intelligence at work in the grim, witty horror-western Bone Tomahawk." The Hollywood Reporter called it "[a] handsome Western with horror overtones", and Variety described it as "...a most violent delight", while Leonard Maltin said "[T]his modest feature leaves The Hateful Eight in the dust. It's provocative, original, extremely violent and extremely good." Twitch Film said "[Bone Tomahawk] succeeds in demonstrating the voice of its massively talented creator." At the Sitges Film Festival Bone Tomahawk won the critic's award for "Best Picture", and Zahler was given the award for "Best Director". The Independent Spirit Awards nominated Richard Jenkins for "Best Supporting Actor" and S. Craig Zahler for "Best Screenplay". Kurt Russell won the "Best Actor" award at the Fangoria Chainsaw Awards.

Zahler's second feature film as writer, director, and co-composer was Brawl in Cell Block 99, which stars Vince Vaughn, Jennifer Carpenter, Udo Kier, and Don Johnson. This movie received its world premiere at the 74th Venice Film Festival in 2017. Actors Fred Melamed and Geno Segers both returned from his debut, and were joined by Marc Blucas, Mustafa Shakir, Thomas Guiry, Willie C. Carpenter, and others. The review aggregation website Rotten Tomatoes, the film has a "certified fresh" approval rating of 92% based on 75 reviews, with an average rating of 7.3/10. The site's critical consensus reads, "Brawl in Cell Block 99 rides a committed Vince Vaughn performance into the brutally violent – and undeniably entertaining – depths of prison-set grindhouse genre fare."

The movie made year end best of lists for Newsweek, (Justin Chang) L.A. Times, Collider, JoBlo.com, (Mike D'Angelo) The A.V. Club, and others.  The picture was a New York Times Critics Pick and was screened at the Museum of Modern Art, where it was added to the permanent collection.

Zahler's third feature film as writer, director, and co-composer was  Dragged Across Concrete, which stars Mel Gibson, Vince Vaughn, Tory Kittles, Michael Jai White, Jennifer Carpenter, Thomas Kretschmann, Laurie Holden, Fred Melamed, Udo Kier, and Don Johnson. This movie received its world premiere at the 75th Venice Film Festival in 2018.

In 2018, it was announced that Zahler would be joining the writing staff of the resurrected Fangoria magazine. As of 2019,  he writes a column called "Malignant Growths" about microbudget horror films.

Film projects 
Zahler told Variety that on June 22, 2006, he began his career at NYU film school as a cinematographer. In 2004, he wrote six scripts, including a western that topped the prestigious Black List entitled, The Brigands of Rattleborge, which Park Chan-wook was set to direct.

On September 7, 2007, The Hollywood Reporter reported that Warner Bros. had acquired the film rights to the anime Robotech with Tobey Maguire attached to star in and produce the film, while Zahler was set to write the script.

On March 25, 2011, Sony's Columbia Pictures picked up the script of the film The Big Stone Grid, written by Zahler and produced by Michael De Luca.

On September 5, 2012, it was announced that FX was developing a martial arts drama, Downtown Dragons, with Zahler set to write and executive produce.

On October 30, 2012, Zahler was set to make his directorial debut with a horror western film Bone Tomahawk from his own script. Two years later, the picture went into production in California. The film stars Kurt Russell and Richard Jenkins.

On June 27, 2013, Warner Bros. acquired the film rights to his crime novel Mean Business on North Ganson Street. He will write the script of the film which is set to star Leonardo DiCaprio and Jamie Foxx.

In 2015, Zahler told Creative Screenwriting, "I’ve had maybe a minimum of 21 different screenplays optioned or sold, and not one of them was made in Hollywood. I had one [The Incident] made by a French company in Belgium, but the other 20 or more – and some of those have been optioned multiple times, I had a television series that was at FX that went to Starz that went to AMC – none of them have been made."

On May 10, 2016, 20th Century Fox acquired the film rights to Zahler's western novel Wraiths of the Broken Land. The screenplay was to be written by Drew Goddard and the film directed by Ridley Scott.

On February 1, 2017, Variety confirmed that Zahler would direct Dragged Across Concrete, a film about police brutality. The film stars Mel Gibson and Vince Vaughn, who previously worked together in the former's 2016 film Hacksaw Ridge. The film premiered at the 75th Venice International Film Festival on September 3, 2018, before receiving a release in the United States on March 22, 2019.

Personal life
Although he was raised Jewish, Zahler is an atheist. Zahler has stated that he is "not politically driven; I’m not very politically interested", believing in the philosophy of "art over politics."

Zahler is unmarried, stating that he has no interest in ever marrying.

Bibliography 
 A Congregation of Jackals (2010)
 Wraiths of the Broken Land (2013)
 Corpus Chrome, Inc. (2014)
 Mean Business on North Ganson Street (2014)
 The Narrow Caves (2017) [audiobook]
 Hug Chickenpenny: The Panegyric of an Anomalous Child (2018)
 The Slanted Gutter (2021)
 Forbidden Surgeries of the Hideous Dr. Divinus (2021) [graphic novel]
 Organisms from an Ancient Cosmos (2022) [graphic novel]

Filmography

Short films – Cinematography by S. Craig Zahler
 August Roads (1995)
 Warsaw Story (1996)
 Lucia's Dream (1997)
 Rooster (2003)

Albums 
As a metal musician, Zahler is better known by his stage name Czar.  As a soundtrack composer and as one half of the synthesizer duo Binary Reptile, he uses his real name.

Charnel Valley (Czar and Worm)
The Dark Archives (2005, Paragon Records)
The Igneous Race (2007, Paragon Records)

Realmbuilder (Czar and JH Halberd)
Summon the Stone Throwers (2009, I Hate Records)
Fortifications of the Pale Architect (2011, I Hate Records)
Blue Flame Cavalry (2013, I Hate Records)

Jeff Herriott & S. Craig Zahler / Binary Reptile
Bone Tomahawk (Original Motion Picture Soundtrack)  (2015, Lakeshore Records)
Crawl into the Narrow Caves (2017, Lakeshore Records) (as Binary Reptile)
Brawl in Cell Block 99 (Original Motion Picture Soundtrack)  (2017, Lakeshore Records)
Dragged Across Concrete (Original Motion Picture Soundtrack)  (2019, Lakeshore Records)

Awards and nominations

References

External links 

 
 
Zahler's account on IMDb

21st-century American novelists
American crime writers
Western (genre) writers
American science fiction writers
American male screenwriters
American cinematographers
Writers from Miami
Film directors from Florida
1973 births
Living people
American male novelists
21st-century American male writers
Novelists from Florida
Screenwriters from Florida
21st-century American screenwriters
American atheists